Mandy Planert (later Benzien, born 26 January 1975) is a retired German slalom canoeist who competed at the international level from 1992 to 2008.

She won six medals at the ICF Canoe Slalom World Championships with three golds (K1 team: 1997, 1999, 2007) and three silvers (K1: 2002, 2005; K1 team: 2003). She is the overall World Cup champion in K1 from 2002. She also won seven medals at the European Championships.

Planert competed in the K1 event at the 2000 and 2004 Olympics and finished 6th and 14th, respectively. She is married to the fellow Olympic canoeist Jan Benzien. They live in Leipzig together with their children Justus Jonas and Mika.

World Cup individual podiums

1 European Championship counting for World Cup points
2 World Championship counting for World Cup points

References

1975 births
Living people
People from Schleiz
People from Bezirk Gera
German female canoeists
Sportspeople from Thuringia
Canoeists at the 2000 Summer Olympics
Canoeists at the 2004 Summer Olympics
Olympic canoeists of Germany
Medalists at the ICF Canoe Slalom World Championships
20th-century German women